State Highway (SH-134) runs in Villupuram District of Tamil Nadu, India. It connects Tindivanam (Talk Headquarters) with Marakkanam (Panchayat Town). Total length of SH-134 is 34 km.

Major junctions

National Highways 
 National Highway NH-45(GST Road) at Tindivanam
 National Highway NH-66 at Tindivanam

State Highways 
 State Highway SH-49 (East Coast Road) at Marakkanam
 State Highway SH-05 at Tindivanam

See also 
 Tamil Nadu State Highways
 State Highway SH-49 (East Coast Road)

State highways in Tamil Nadu